The 1999 Brasil Open singles was the tennis singles event of the first edition of the most prestigious tournament in Brazil. South American Fabiola Zuluaga won the title, defeating Patricia Wartusch in the final.

Seeds

Draw

Finals

Top half

Bottom half

Qualifying

Seeds

Qualifiers

Qualifying draw

First qualifier

Second qualifier

Third qualifier

Fourth qualifier

References
 ITF results page
 Main draw (WTA)

Singles